Urabá Antioquia is a subregion in the Colombian Department of Antioquia that consists of two enclaves, one forming the northwest corner of the department the other, the west, both are along the Atrato River and are separated by the El Carmen del Darién and Riosucio municipalities of the Chocó Department with territories in both municipalities in dispute with Chocó. The region is made up by 11 municipalities. Most of this region's northern portion is part of the Colombian Caribbean Region bordering the Caribbean sea.

Urabá Antioquia also acts as the headquarters of the powerful and ruthless Clan del Golfo, a cocaine-trafficking, neo-paramilitary organization.

Municipalities
 Apartadó
 Arboletes
 Carepa
 Chigorodó
 Murindó
 Mutatá
 Turbo
 Necoclí
 San Juan de Urabá
 San Pedro de Urabá
 Vigía del Fuerte

Notable people
 

Luis Eduardo Gómez (born ca. 1941), freelance journalist

References

Regions of Antioquia Department